The T34 Heavy Tank was an American design for a heavy tank. It evolved from the T29 Heavy Tank and T30 Heavy Tank in 1945, using the same chassis, but sporting a  modified 120 mm Gun M1 anti-aircraft gun. Extra armor plating was applied to the rear of the turret bustle as a counterweight for the heavier 120mm T53 main gun. No production orders were placed for the T34, which was felt to be too heavy.

Development 
In 1945, encounters with German heavy tanks and tank destroyers such as the Tiger II and Jagdtiger led to a new project to create a vehicle that could counter these new threats. The result were the T29, armed with a 105mm gun, and the T30 armed with a 155mm gun. Both were built around 
a lengthened version of the T26E3 chassis., and apart from the different use of guns and engines, they were originally almost identical.

Early in 1945 the Ordnance Department began work on turning the 120mm anti-aircraft gun into a tank gun. It soon became clear that this gun would have better armour piercing abilities than the high velocity 105mm gun of the T29 or the lower velocity 155mm gun of the T30, and in May 1945 the Ordnance Department recommended that two of the T30 pilots be armed with the 120mm gun instead, as the Heavy Tank T34. 

The two pilot models of the T34 weren't delivered until 1947, and they went for tests at Fort Knox and the Aberdeen Proving Ground. However, the 120mm gun was found to be problematic due to the powder gases which leaked into the turret. This problem was addressed by the installation of an aspirator type bore evacuator. 

Despite solving the problems with the gun, the tank was deemed too heavy for the US Army and the Marine Corps requirements, so no production orders were placed. However, in 1948 a work began on lightened version of the design, the Heavy Tank T43, which later entered production as the M103 Heavy Tank.

Survivors 

There is at least one surviving example on display in the National Armor and Cavalry Museum, Fort Benning, Georgia.

References 

Heavy tanks of the United States
Abandoned military projects of the United States
History of the tank